John Edward Burgess (9 December 1930 - 9 March 2019) was an Anglican priest who was Archdeacon of Bath from 1975 to 1995.

Burgess was educated at Surbiton County Grammar School and  the University of London. After six years working for Shell he went to the London School of Theology. He was ordained deacon in 1957 and priest in 1958 and then served curacies at St Mary Magdalen Bermondsey (1957–60) and St Mary's Church, Southampton (1960-62). He was Vicar of Coppenhall from 1962 to 1967; and then of Keynsham until his appointment as Archdeacon.

He was married to Jonquil. He died in 2019, aged 88.

Notes

1930 births
Alumni of the University of London
Alumni of the London School of Theology
People educated at Surbiton County Grammar School
Archdeacons of Bath
2019 deaths
Shell plc people